Welcome to the Parker is an American reality television series on Bravo that premiered on July 26, 2007.

Premise
The series follows the employees at the Parker Palm Springs hotel in Palm Springs, California.

Cast
 Samir Chraibi, hotel manager
 Thomas Meding, general manager
 Michael Crawford, host of hotel restaurant, Mister Parker's
 John Federbusch, chef concierge
 Lynne Dibley, HR director
 Rocio Varela, executive chef
 Michael Twomey, catering sales manager
 Andrea Higgins, sales
 Nathaniel Lourn, room service waiter

Episodes

References

External links
 Official hotel site

2000s American reality television series
2007 American television series debuts
2007 American television series endings
Bravo (American TV network) original programming
English-language television shows
Television shows set in Palm Springs, California